Kurtna is a village in Saku Parish, Harju County in northern Estonia.

Sport
Kurtna is home to Estonian Bandy Association:

References

 

Villages in Harju County
Kreis Harrien